The 2019 Los Angeles Marathon, the 34th annual edition of the Los Angeles Marathon, was held in Los Angeles, California, United States on March 24, 2019. The men's race was won by Kenya's Elisha Barno, and the women's race was won by Ethiopia's Askale Merachi in a course record time. The race is the fourth-largest marathon in the U.S. with 19,992 finishers. The last finisher crossed the finish line 8:43:03 after the 6:55 a.m. start.

Summary 
Elisha Barno won the 2019 Los Angeles Marathon with a record time for a Kenyan runner of 2:11:45, John Korir of Kenya finished second with a time of 2:11:52, Juan Luis Barrios finished third with a time of 2:11:59.

For 15 miles, several of the elite men ran together in a pack. With Korir often leading the pack, there was little to no gap between those at the front, which included fellow Kenyans Weldon Kirui and Philemon Cheboi, Mexican Juan Luis Barrios, and American Tyler McCandless. Shortly after the 20 mile mark, Korir surged ahead, cranking out sub-5 minute miles. The gap between him and the rest of the pack widened to nearly a half-minute with three miles to go.

In the last half mile, Korir ran past the roar of the crowd on Ocean Avenue toward Santa Monica Pier, unaware that Barno was closing the gap by running a furious pace. Korir's pace had slowed considerably; he did not look back, and with only 200 meters left, Barno passed him.

Barno, an experienced marathoner with four consecutive marathon wins at Grandma's Marathon in Duluth, Minnesota, crossed the finish line seven seconds ahead of Korir and collapsed on the blacktop, covering his face with his hands. Korir crossed the finish, made the sign of the cross, knelt next to him, grabbed his hand and congratulated him on the win. It was the closest finish in the Los Angeles men's marathon history.

Askale Merachi won the women's race with a time of 2:24:11. She left the pack of lead women with Cynthia Jerop, and the two ran side by side until just after the 20-mile mark.

Joshua Cassidy won the men's wheelchair race and Katrina Gerhard claimed the women's equivalent.

Results
The results were as follows.

Men

Video of podium ceremony for the men by ABC News correspondent Natalie Brunell

Women

Video of podium ceremony for the women by ABC News correspondent Natalie Brunell

Wheelchair men

Wheelchair women

References

External links
 http://results2.xacte.com/#/e/2232/leaderboard

2019
Los Angeles Marathon
Los Angeles Marathon
Chicago
Marathon
Los Angeles Marathon